The 1990 FIA European Formula Three Cup was the sixth European Formula Three Cup race and the first to be held at the Bugatti Circuit at Le Mans on September 23, 1990. The race was won by Italian Alessandro Zanardi, driving for RC Motorsport outfit after Michael Schumacher was disqualified from the race and stripped of his race win. Italian Mirko Savoldi and Frenchman Yvan Muller completed the podium. Only eleven drivers entered the race. It was the last season of the FIA European Formula 3 Cup, before it reappeared in 1999.

Drivers and teams

Classification

Qualifying

Race

See also
FIA European Formula Three Cup

References

FIA European Formula Three Cup
FIA European Formula Three Cup